Courts of Georgia include:
;State courts of Georgia
Supreme Court of Georgia
Georgia Court of Appeals
Georgia Superior Courts (49 judicial circuits)
Georgia State Courts
Georgia Magistrate Courts
Georgia Juvenile Courts
Georgia Probate Courts
Georgia Municipal Courts

Federal courts located in Georgia
United States Court of Appeals for the Eleventh Circuit (headquartered in Atlanta, having jurisdiction over the United States District Courts of Alabama, Florida, and Georgia)
United States District Court for the Northern District of Georgia
United States District Court for the Middle District of Georgia
United States District Court for the Southern District of Georgia

Former federal courts of Georgia
United States District Court for the District of Georgia (extinct, subdivided)

See also
 Judiciary of Georgia (U.S. state)

References

External links
National Center for State Courts – directory of state court websites.

Courts in the United States